Jesper Thusgård Kristiansen (born 9 December 1966) is a Danish rower. He competed in the men's eight event at the 1992 Summer Olympics.

References

External links
 

1966 births
Living people
Danish male rowers
Olympic rowers of Denmark
Rowers at the 1992 Summer Olympics
People from Holstebro
Sportspeople from the Central Denmark Region